"Turn Out the Night" is a new wave and synthpop song by Amy Holland from the soundtrack for the film Scarface.

Song information
The song sampled "Flashdance... What a Feeling" and was written by Pete Bellotte while the music was composed by Giorgio Moroder. When the song was released on the soundtrack, it was accidentally misprinted as Turn Out The Light and the correction to the song's title, but was not corrected, leading up to many people thinking the song is called Turn Out The Light but the correct title is Turn Out The Night and it can be proven by the song's lyrics: Turn Out The Night, I can be strong as long as there's daylight. While most of the songs from the Scarface soundtrack were put into Grand Theft Auto III, "Turn Out The Night" was not. Amy Holland also recorded another song for the Scarface soundtrack "She's On Fire" which did end up on the soundtrack for Grand Theft Auto III. The song is played in the scene where Tony Montana and his friend Manny Ribera arrive at the Babylon Club only to see that Tony's sister Gina is dancing with her boyfriend Fernando.

1983 songs
Amy Holland songs
Scarface (1983 film)
Song recordings produced by Giorgio Moroder
MCA Records singles
Songs written by Pete Bellotte
Songs written by Giorgio Moroder